Semyonovka is a rural locality (a selo) and the administrative center of Semyonovsky Selsoviet, Kulundinsky District, Altai Krai, Russia. The population was 404 as of 2013. There are 4 streets.

Geography 
Semyonovka is located 37 km east of Kulunda (the district's administrative centre) by road. Ozyornoye is the nearest rural locality.

References 

Rural localities in Kulundinsky District